Naron was a town located in Pratt County, Kansas, near present-day Byers, Kansas. The town was started in 1878 by Levi Holloway Naron who had moved there from Mississippi where he spied for the Union in the Civil War.

A post office was located in Naron from 1881 to 1907.

The town had a population of 45 in 1910; it was disorganized around 1970.

References 

Cities in Pratt County, Kansas
Former populated places in Kansas